The 1995 AT&T Challenge was an ATP men's tennis  tournament held in Atlanta, Georgia, United States that was part of the World Series of the 1995 ATP Tour. It was the 11th edition of the tournament and was held from May 1 through May 7, 1995. Second-seeded Michael Chang won his second consecutive singles title at the event.

Finals

Singles
 Michael Chang defeated  Andre Agassi, 6–2, 6–7(6–8), 6–4
 It was Chang's 2nd singles title of the year and 21st of his career.

Doubles
 Sergio Casal /  Emilio Sánchez defeated  Jared Palmer /  Richey Reneberg 6–7, 6–3, 7–6

References

External links
 ITF tournament edition details

ATandT Challenge
Verizon Tennis Challenge
ATandT Challenge